The 2016 1000 Guineas Stakes was a horse race held at Newmarket Racecourse on Sunday 1 May 2016. It was the 203rd running of the 1000 Guineas.

The winner was Derrick Smith, Susan Magnier & Michael Tabor's Minding, an Irish-bred bay filly trained at Ballydoyle by Aidan O'Brien and ridden by Ryan Moore. Minding's victory was the third in the race for Moore after Homecoming Queen (2012, trained by O'Brien) and Legatissimo (2015). O'Brien had also won the race in 1996 with Virginia Waters.

The contenders
The race attracted a field of sixteen runners, ten trained in the United Kingdom, five in Ireland and one in France. The favourite for the race was the Irish-trained Minding who had won the Moyglare Stud Stakes and Fillies' Mile in 2015 and had been voted Cartier Champion Two-year-old Filly. She was accompanied by her stable companions Ballydoyle, who had beaten Minding in the Debutante Stakes and won the Prix Marcel Boussac, and Alice Springs, the runner-up in the Breeders' Cup Juvenile Fillies Turf. The other two Irish runners were Turret Rocks (May Hill Stakes) and Jet Setting (Leopardstown 1,000 Guineas Trial). France was represented by the Criquette Head-trained Midweek, who had finished second in the Prix Imprudence. The best fancied of the British contingent were Lumiere (Cheveley Park Stakes) and Nathrah (Nell Gwyn Stakes), whilst the other runners included Fireglow (Star Stakes, Montrose Stakes), Blue Bayou (Sweet Solera Stakes and Epsom Icon (Washington Singer Stakes). Minding headed the betting at odds of 11/10 ahead of Lumiere (13/2), Ballydoyle (15/2) Nathrah (8/1) and Midweek (12/1).

The race
The starting stalls were positioned on the stand-side (the left-hand side from the jockeys' viewpoint) and the fillies raced in a single group on the stand-side throughout the race. Lumiere broke quickly and tracked to the rail to set the early pace, with Minding, Fireglow, Turret Rocks, Jet Setting and Sharja Queen close behind. As the fillies approached the cutaway two furlongs from the finish Lumiere began to struggle and dropped back quickly. Minding, racing towards the centre of the leading group, went to the front and opened up a clear advantage as Alice Springs moved into second and Ballydoyle, who had struggled to obtain a clear run, began to make rapid progress along the rail. Most of the other runners were under pressure with only Fireglow able to stay in contention with the O'Brien trio. Minding never looked in any anger of defeat in the final furlong and won by three and a half lengths from Ballydoyle with Alice Springs completing a 1-2-3 for the trainer by beating Fireglow for third. Nathra took fifth ahead of Turret Rocks and the 50/1 outsider Mix and Mingle. Lumiere finished last.

Race details
 Sponsor: QIPCO
 First prize: £297,018
 Surface: Turf
 Going: Good
 Distance: 8 furlongs
 Number of runners: 16
 Winner's time: 1:36.53

Full result

 Abbreviations: nse = nose; nk = neck; shd = head; hd = head; dist = distance; UR = unseated rider; DSQ = disqualified; PU = pulled up

Winner's details
Further details of the winner, Minding
 Foaled: 10 February 2013
 Country: Ireland
 Sire: Galileo; Dam: Lillie Langtry (Danehill Dancer)
 Owner: Derrick Smith & Mrs John Magnier & Michael Tabor
 Breeder: Orpendale, Chelston & Wynatt

References

1000 Guineas
 2016
2016 in British sport
1000 Guineas
1000 Guineas